Fred Cronin (16 September 1882 – 4 June 1964) was an Australian rules footballer who played with Geelong in the Victorian Football League (VFL).

Notes

External links 

1882 births
1964 deaths
Australian rules footballers from Victoria (Australia)
Geelong Football Club players